Ron W. Tusler (born March 21, 1984) is an American attorney and Republican politician.  He is a member of the Wisconsin State Assembly, representing the 3rd Assembly district since 2017.

Biography
From Appleton, Wisconsin, Tusler received his bachelor's degree from University of Wisconsin–Milwaukee and his J.D. degree from Marquette University Law School. He practices law in Appleton and is involved with the Republican Party. Tusler was elected to the Wisconsin State Assembly in 2016. His great grandfather, Gordon A. Bubolz, served in the Wisconsin Senate.

Tusler worked as the elections committee chair in November 2020 when Assembly Speaker Robin Vos called for an Assembly committee with subpoena powers to oversee an investigation into potential fraud surrounding alleged “concerns surfacing about mail-in ballot dumps and voter fraud” in Wisconsin. During this time, Vice chair, Rep. Joe Sanfelippo (R-New Berlin) said the committee may need to overturn Wisconsin voters’ choice of Joe Biden and conduct a new election or order electors to vote instead to give the state’s 10 Electoral College votes to Donald Trump. Legal experts said either action is beyond the power of the committee and would violate state and federal law. During this time, Rep. Ron Tusler (R-Harrison) would not responded to multiple inquiries about whether Sanfelippo was speaking in his leadership role for the caucus and, if not, whether they agree with the steps he laid out.

References

External links
 
 
 Tusler Law LLC

1984 births
Living people
Politicians from Appleton, Wisconsin
University of Wisconsin–Milwaukee alumni
Marquette University Law School alumni
Wisconsin lawyers
Republican Party members of the Wisconsin State Assembly
21st-century American politicians